The Nationwide Children's Hospital Columbus Marathon is a marathon held in Columbus, Ohio, United States. First run in 1978 and held annually since 1980, it features a flat, fast course which saw nearly 20 percent of finishers qualify for the Boston Marathon in 2010.  The event has sold-out in mid-August the past eight years. There are 7,000 runners in the full marathon and 11,000 in the half marathon, making it one of the largest running events in the United States. Proceeds go to Nationwide Children's Hospital. 2018 marks the seventh year of this partnership; so far $7 million has been raised for the Hospital. This includes more than $800,000 contributed since 2012 by the Columbus Marathon Board of Directors.

History
The concept of the Columbus Marathon was the brainchild of former Mayors Tom Moody and Greg Lashutka as a way to put Columbus on the map and showcase the city at the same time. The inaugural race was held on June 4, 1978. The 1980 race, on November 16, hosted 2,500 runners. Tommy Persson of Sweden set a course record of 2:11:02 that year which remains unbroken (as of 2017).

The 2020 edition of the race was cancelled due to the coronavirus pandemic, with all registrants automatically receiving full refunds.

Course
The cloverleaf design of the course also makes it easy for spectators to see their athletes at several different points – all within a block walking distance. The course begins in downtown Columbus and takes athletes east through Bexley, Ohio, past the Governor's Mansion and Capital University; back through the festive neighborhood of Old Town East; south through German Village; up High Street through downtown Columbus and the Short North Arts District; a jaunt through Ohio State University, including past The Oval and through Ohio Stadium, home of the football Buckeyes, and through Upper Arlington, through the tree-lined streets of Victorian Village and back to a huge crowd awaiting finishers outside Nationwide Arena in the Arena District.

Event records
Male Marathon: Tommy Persson of Sweden in 2:11:02 – 1980
Female Marathon: Lyudmyla Pushkina of Ukraine, 2:28:15 – 2003
Male ½ Marathon: James Ngandu of Kenya in 1:02:14 - 2019
Female ½ Marathon: Vicoty Chepngeno of Kenya in 1:10:24 - 2019
Male Wheelchair: Ernst Van Dyk of South Africa in 1:26:47 – 2003
Female Wheelchair: Jean Driscoll of Illinois in 1:51:08 – 1993
Male Hand Cycle: Dane Pilon, Fayetteville, NC in 1:10:47–2010
Female Hand Cycle: Dianna Johnson of Indiana in 2:26:22 – 2008

Columbus to Boston
Columbus remains one of the top marathons to qualify runners for the Boston Marathon. The Columbus Marathon has affected Columbus and Central Ohio. More than 250,000 runners have come from 37 countries and all 50 states to participate in the Columbus Marathon. The Columbus Marathon is also one of the last qualifying marathons before registration opens for the Boston Marathon.

Olympics qualification
More than 50 Olympians have run in Columbus, including the 1980 men's Silver Medalist, Gerard , 1984 Women's Gold Medalist, Joan Benoit, 1984 Men's Fourth Place Finisher, Joseph Nzau and 1984 Women's 6th Place Finisher, Priscilla Welch. 
In 1983, seven women qualified for the Women's U.S. Olympic Trials event, six of them were from the state of Ohio. The top 10 males also qualified for their Olympic Trials events. Seven of them men ran in the 1984 Olympics for their respective countries. The following year, eight Olympians competed in the Columbus Marathon.
In 1992, 109 of the country's top runners came to Columbus. Only 3 would qualify for the team and their quest for a medal at the Summer Olympics: Steve Spence, Ed Eyestone, and Bob Kempainen.

Since then, more and more athletes have come to Columbus to qualify for the Olympic Marathon Trials.

Designations
The Columbus Marathon has been designated by Runner's World as one of the Top 20 marathons in the nation and by USA Today as one of the top 10 Fall marathons.

Race directors
Mike VanBuskirk (1980–1981)
Bill Dejong (1982)
Doug Thurston (1992–1994)
Joan Riegel (1995–1999)
Mike Collins (1983–1991; 2000–2005)
Scott Weaver (2006–2009)
Darris Blackford (2010 – Present)

References

External links

Official website
 Race History, website of the Association of Road Racing Statisticians (ARRS)

Recurring sporting events established in 1978
Marathons in the United States
Bexley, Ohio
Events in Columbus, Ohio